Hossein Fatemi (born 1980, Ardabil, Iran) is an Iranian photojournalist. He received the 2nd place World Press Photo Award in 2017, and the Picture of the Year International (POYi) in 2016 and 2014 in two categories. He is a member of Panos Pictures since 2010.

Early life 
Hossein began his journey as a photojournalist covering politics and social events in his native Iran at the age of 17. Between 2006 and 2008 he covered the wars in Lebanon and Georgia respectively and in 2009 he moved to Afghanistan where he documented the American ground operation and the lives of ordinary Afghans in the aftermath of years of constant war.

Hossein's work has been exhibited widely and his travels have taken him around the world including: Pakistan, Armenia, Turkey, Iraq, Russia, India, Somalia, Kenya and Bangladesh. He has won a World Press Photo Award for his long-term work on Iran, numerous awards at the China International Press Photo Contest (CHIPP), the Pictures of the Year International (POYi) and the DAYS Japan International Photojournalism Awards.

He currently lives in New York covering human rights, social, environmental and political issues. His photographs have been published in numerous national and international journals including Newsweek, New York Times, Time, The Guardian, and Washington Post. The documentary " Exposed" is in production by Hassan Khademi covering his life story as an Iranian photojournalist.

Awards
World Press Photo, 2nd Place Long Term Project, 2017
China International Photojournalism Contest, Silver Medal, 2017
Picture of the Year International (POYi), World Understanding Award, 2016
FotoEvidence, Book Awards, 2015
Picture of the Year International (POYi), Portrait Series, 3rd Place, 2014
Picture of the Year International (POYi), Award of Excellence, 2014
LensCulture, Portrait Awards, 2nd Prize, 2014
Days Japan International Photojournalism Awards, 2013
Art of Photography Show, USA, Grant Recipient, 2013
UNICEF Photo of the Year, Award, Honorable Mention, 2012
Awakening World Awards, Grand Prize, Iran, 2012
China International Photojournalism Contest, Gold Medal, 2011
China International Photojournalism Contest 2007
China International Photojournalism Contest 2009

Exhibitions

2020: Standoff at Standing Rock: BursaPhotoFest, Istanbul
2017: Beyond the Ban: Contemporary Iranian Art, group exhibition, Susal Eley Gallery, New York
2016: Veiled Truths Series Exhibition, Elizabeth Houston Gallery, New York
2016: An Iranian Journey, Museum of Contemporary Photography, Chicago
2014: Under the Surface: A photographic portrait of the Middle East, Th!nkArt, Chicago
2016 :Afghanistan: A Troubled Legacy, LUMIX Photo Festival in Hannover, Germany
2014 : An Iranian Journey, LUMIX Photo Festival in Hannover, Germany
2014: Veiled Truths Series, part of group exhibition, EXPO Chicago, Chicago
2013: Afghanistan: A Troubled Legacy: Chobi Mela VI, Dhaka

Experience

Middle East Images Agency - 2018–Present
Panos Pictures – 2010–Present
Associated Press (AP) – 2010 - 2011
United Press International (UPI) – 2009 - 2010
Fars News Agency – 2003- 2008

Publications

References

1980 births
Living people
Iranian photojournalists
Iranian expatriates in the United States
People from Ardabil Province